Bijaya Jena (also known as Dolly Jena or Bijoya Jena, born 16 August in Cuttack, Odisha, is an Indian actor, film director and producer. She won the Indian National Film Award (Best director) for the Odia language film Tara.

Jena played Laila in Razia Sultan and then later proceeded to act in some Odia films. After acting in several films, she went on to direct and write several scripts of her own. She served on the Governing Council of FTII from 1992 to 1995.

Early life
Jena is the youngest of three children. Her mother came from a Zamindar background and her father, the late B. C. Jena was a Civil Engineer. In her early teens, Jena enrolled in the Film and Television Institute of India and received her Diploma of Film Acting.

Jena participated in an International Transpersonal Association Conference (a science and religion conference). She later attended a course in Erhard Seminars Training.

Acting career
Jena performed in Hindi and Odia films, television serials like Ek Kahani, Vikram Betaal, Param Veer Chakra and TV plays like Gogol's Inspector General, Mahesh Elkunchwar's Aks Aur Aina. 
She received the State Award for Best Actress for her performance in the Odia film Jaga Balia. 
Hindi films include K. A. Abbas' The Naxalites, Kamal Amrohi's Razia Sultan, Ketan Mehta's Holi. She appeared in Hakim Babu which received a National Award for Best Odia Film. Jena also appeared in Ismail Merchant's British film, The Deceivers, directed by Nicholas Meyer.

Writing, directing and production career
In 1992, Jena made her directoral debut with the Odia language film, Tara. She cowrote the script and produced the film and also played the title role. Tara was based on a short story by Bimal Dutt, who was the main scriptwriter. Tara was completed with a budget of approximately US$20,000, which Jena borrowed from family members and national and state government agencies. The film received the 1992 National Award for Best Odia Film. The President of the Jury, Adoor Gopalakrishnan described Jena as a promising director. Tara screened at the 1992 Festival International du Cinema Au Feminin in Marseilles, France and at the 1992 Cairo International Film Festival.

Jena's second film, Abhaas (1997) is in the Hindi language. Jena acted, scripted, directed, and produced the film. The film's budget was approximately US$60,000. The film's script advisor was István Gaál. Abhaas was screened at the 1997 Festival International du Film de la Rochelle, France; the 1997 Penang Film Festival, Malaysia and the 1997 Cairo International Film Festival. In 2013, Abhaas was telecast on BBC Channel 4, BBC as part of the "100 years of Indian Cinema" celebration. It was also shown by the Mauritius Broadcasting Corporation in October 2014.

In 2016, Jena plans to make a film Danapani ("The Survivor"). Jena wrote the script adapted from the Odia novel by late Gopinath Mohanty. The script was approved by the India National Film Development Corporation.

Acting credits

 Abhaas (Prologue) (1997) (Hindi Film)
 Tara (1992) (Odia Film)
 Gunehgar Kaun (1991) (Hindi Film)
 The Deceivers (1988) (English Film)
 Jantar Mantar (1988) (TV Episodes)
 Param Veer Chakra (1988) (TV Episode: Albert Eka)
 Vikram Aur Betaal (1987) (TV Episode no. 10)
 Ek Kahani (1987) (TV episode: Odia story)
 Uparaant (1987) (Hindi Film)
 Amma (1986) (Hindi Film)
 Hakim Babu (1985) (Odia Film)
 Holi (1985) (Hindi Film)
 Heera Neela (1984) (Odia Film)
 Jaga Balia (1984) (Odia Film)
 Ashara Akash (1983) (Odia Film)
 Razia Sultan (1983) (Hindi Film)
 The Naxalites (1981) (Hindi Film)

Awards

 Odia State Award (Best Actress) for Jaga Balia, 1984
 Nominated for Best Actress for "Tara" in Women's Film Festival (Marseille, France, 1992)
 Indian National Film Awards 1992 (Best Regional Film in Odia) for Tara 
 Nominated for Golden Pyramid for Hindi film "Abhaas" in Cairo International Film Festival, 1997 (Egypt)
 Lifetime Dedication Award (Odisha, 2012)
 Pinamar Municipality Award (Argentina, 2014)

Jury member
Member of the jury of Indian National Film Awards (feature film category, 1993) 
Member of the jury in Fajr International Film Festival (Teheran, 2007)
Member of the jury in 1st Kish International Film Festival (Iran, 2011)
Member of the jury in Roshd International Film Festival (Iran, 2012)
Member of the jury in Golden Apricot International Film Festival (Armenia, 2015)
Member of the jury in Features category, All Lights India International Film Festival (Cochin, 2015)
Member of the jury of Indian Panorama's feature film section, IFFI (Goa, 2015)
Chairperson of the jury in Goa State Film Festival Awards (Goa, 2016)
Member of the jury of Indian competition section in Bengaluru International Film Festival (February, 2017) 
Chairperson of the jury, Heritage Short Films Section, Guwahati Film Festival (Assam, 2017)
Member of the Jury in the selection committee for Indian Oscar Entry (September, 2017) 
Member of the jury in Dhaka International Film Festival (Bangladesh, January, 2018)
Member of the jury in Aswan International Women Film Festival (Egypt, February, 2018)
Member of the jury in International Competition, Kolkata International Film Festival, 2019
Member of the jury in International Competition, 6th Herat International Women's Film Festival, Afghanistan, 2020
Member of the jury in central panel of 67th National Film Awards, 2021
Member of the jury in International Competition, Rome Independent Film Festival, 2021
Member of the jury in International Competition, Tallinn Black Nights Film Festival, 2022

References

External links
 
 
 "Bijaya Jena". Author biography on Huffington Post.

Year of birth missing (living people)
Living people
20th-century Indian actresses
Indian film actresses
Film producers from Odisha
Indian women film directors
Indian women film producers
Odia film directors
People from Cuttack
Film directors from Odisha
Screenwriters from Odisha
20th-century Indian film directors
Actresses from Odisha
Indian television actresses
Indian women screenwriters
Women writers from Odisha
Businesswomen from Odisha